Pataini temple or Pataini devi temple in a 5th century Jain temple located near Unchehara town in the state of Madhya Pradesh. The temple was constructed during the reign of Gupta Empire.

Location 
The temple is located on a lofty hill  North of Unchehara on Satna-Unchehara road in the state of Madhya Pradesh.

History 
This temple, discovered by Alexander Cunningham in 1873-74, is noted to date back to Gupta Empire. The temple houses a 10th—11th century inscription that details the name of residing deities.

Architecture 

The temple is a small  structure notable for its massive Gupta style single flat slab  roof. The temple enshrines a  idol of Jain Goddess Pataini Devi flanked by two male figures inside a small mandapa. The idol originally had 4 arms but are now damaged and thus idol is not recoginsable.

The temple entrance has an ornate door frame and features two remarkable mouldings which is a common feature of Gupta architecture.

Sculptures 

The mandapa of the temple enshrines an idol of Jain Goddess Pataini Devi flanked by two male figures. The idol is surrounded by small figures, 5 above, 7 to the right and left, and 4 below the idol. Above these figures are carvings of Tirthankaras in lotus position with image of Neminatha seated on a pedestal with symbol Shankha (conch).

According to a 10th—11th century inscription, the figures are named as follows:

The doorway outside has three figures, in the middle is an image of Rishabhanatha seated under a canopy with a bull pedestal. On the left and right sides, there is a five-headed snake hood image of Suparshvanatha and a seven-headed snake hood image of Parshvanatha. The presiding idol of Pataini Devi was identified Jain Goddess based on these three images by Alexander Cunningham. There are carvings of Shiva and Parvati below the images of Tirthankara. The bottom of the door jabs bears images of Goddess Yamuna and Ganga with attendants.

See also 
 Kahaum pillar
 Aihole
 Bhitargaon
 Dashavatara Temple, Deogarh

Notes

References

Citation

Sources

External links

 Pathain Devi statue image

Jain temples in Madhya Pradesh
5th-century Jain temples